José Eldon de Araújo Lobo Júnior (born 10 August 1956 in Luanda, Angola), known as Lito, is a Portuguese former footballer who played as a right winger.

External links

1956 births
Living people
Portuguese sportspeople of Angolan descent
Footballers from Luanda
Portuguese footballers
Association football wingers
Primeira Liga players
Vitória F.C. players
S.C. Braga players
Sporting CP footballers
Portugal youth international footballers
Portugal under-21 international footballers
Portugal international footballers